Martin State Airport, also referred to as Martin Airport, is a passenger rail station on the Northeast Corridor serving Martin State Airport in the unincorporated community of Middle River, Maryland. It is located in between the Aberdeen and Baltimore stations. It is served by the MARC Penn Line; Amtrak trains pass through the station without stopping.

Station layout
The station is non-compliant with the Americans with Disabilities Act of 1990, lacking raised platforms for level boarding.

The station features a single side platform on the outer northbound track with wooden boards allowing passenger access to other tracks. Trains generally stop on Tracks 1 and 3.

The tracks are numbered in accordance with the former Pennsylvania Railroad's convention of retaining track numbers relative to their position in a four-track main line, with tracks adjacent to "Track 1" using successive letters beginning with "Track A." Track A merges into Track 1 both approximately five miles North and South of the station.

References

External links

 Station from Google Maps Street View
2010 MDOT study
Martin State Airport MARC Station (Road and Rail Pictures)

Penn Line
Railway stations in the United States opened in 1991
Stations on the Northeast Corridor
MARC Train stations
MTN